Canon Patrick Power (8 March 1862 – 16 October 1951), was a noted historian of the Catholic Church in Ireland. He was born on 8 March 1862, in Callaghane, Co. Waterford and educated at the  Catholic University School and St. John's College, Waterford.

Power was ordained a priest and worked in Liverpool and Australia and was later attached to Waterford Cathedral. He was also a diocesan schools inspector and lecturer in archaeology at St Patrick's College, Maynooth between 1910 and 1931. He was Professor of Archaeology at University College Cork (UCC) between 1915 and 1934, and a member of the Royal Irish Academy. During his time in Cork he was awarded a D.Litt., by the National University of Ireland. He was also appointed a Canon of the Catholic Church.

He died 16 October 1951.

References

Introduction to The Place-Names of Decies (2nd ed.) by Alfred O'Rahilly 1952

Works
 Places and Names of Decies (1907)
 Parochial History of Waterford and Lismore (1912; 1937)
 Lives of Declan and Mochuda (ITS 1914)
 Place Names and Antiquities of S. E. Cork (1917)
 Ardmore-Deaglain (1919)
 Prehistoric Ireland (1922)
 Early Christian Ireland (1925)
 The Ancient Topography of Fermoy (1931)
 A Bishop of the Penal Times (1932)
 A Short History of Co. Waterford (1933)
 The Cathedral and Priory of the Holy Trinity, Waterford (1942)
 He was also the  editor of the Journal of Waterford and S. E. Ireland Archaeological Society.

External links
 
 
 

People from County Waterford
20th-century Irish Roman Catholic priests
1862 births
1951 deaths
19th-century Irish Roman Catholic priests
Members of the Royal Irish Academy
Alumni of St John's College, Waterford